The Seahawk Condor is an American ultralight aircraft that was designed by Buddy Head, Bob Carswell and Dave French and produced by Seahawk Industries and later by Condor Aircraft. The aircraft was supplied as a kit for amateur construction.

Design and development
It features a cable-braced high-wing, open cockpit, tricycle landing gear and a single engine in pusher configuration. The aircraft closely resembles the contemporary Quicksliver MX.

The aircraft is made from bolted-together aluminum tubing, with the wings and tail surfaces covered in Dacron sailcloth. Its  span wing is cable-braced from a single tube kingpost. The landing gear does not incorporate suspension. The standard powerplant supplied was the Kawasaki 440 which produces . The aircraft has a power-off glide ratio of 7:1.

The reported assembly time from the factory-supplied kit is 75 hours.

The aircraft was produced in two versions, the Condor II and III.

Variants
Condor II
Basic single seat model
Condor III
Two seats in side-by-side configuration model with structurally strengthening. The Condor III employs a benchseat and a single shared set of controls and so can be used by heavier pilots as well as for training.

Specifications (Condor III)

References

1980s United States ultralight aircraft
Homebuilt aircraft
Single-engined pusher aircraft